Machadoella is a genus of parasitic alveolates in the phylum Apicomplexa.

Species in this genus infect species of the family Reduviidae.

History

This genus was created by Reichenow in 1935.

The type species - Machadoella spinigeri - was first described by Machado in 1913.

Taxonomy

Two species are currently recognised in this genus.

Lifecycle

The species in this genus develop in the Malphigian tubules of their host.

The trophozoites are worm like with longitudinal folds.

The schizonts are globular with multiple nuclei.

The gamonts are elongated and slightly swollen at the level of the nucleus.

Syzygy occurs at the anterior end of the gamonts.

The gametes are similar in size (isogamy).

The spores are fusiform (lemon shaped).

References

Apicomplexa genera